Glienicke Palace is a historic palace located on the peninsula of Berlin-Wannsee in Germany. It was designed by Karl Friedrich Schinkel around 1825 for Prince Carl of Prussia. Since 1990, Glienicke Palace and the park have been part of the UNESCO World Heritage Site "Palaces and Parks of Potsdam and Berlin" because of their unique contribution to Prussian landscape architecture.

Location
The palace is situated near the Glienicke Bridge, on the Bundesstraße 1 across from the Glienicke Hunting Lodge. Around the palace is Park Glienicke.

History
The palace was designed by Karl Friedrich Schinkel for Prince Carl of Prussia. The building, originally merely a cottage, was turned into a summer palace in the late Neoclassical style. Inside the palace were antique objets d'art which Prince Carl of Prussia brought back from his trips.

Particularly striking are two golden lion statues in front of the south frontage, which were also designed by Schinkel. The lions are versions of the "Medici lions" from the Villa Medici in Rome.

The palace is administered by the Stiftung Preußische Schlösser und Gärten Berlin-Brandenburg. The palace's park is now called the Volkspark Glienicke.

Gallery

See also
 List of castles in Berlin and Brandenburg
 Palaces and Parks of Potsdam and Berlin

References

External links

Glienicke Palace
Potsdam from Above – Schloss Glienicke

Palaces in Berlin
Royal residences in Berlin
Buildings and structures in Steglitz-Zehlendorf
World Heritage Sites in Germany
Museums in Berlin
Historic house museums in Germany
Prussian cultural sites